Primera Balita is a Philippine television news broadcasting program broadcast by GMA Dagupan that aired from April 27, 2009, to April 24, 2015.

Overview
The program preempts the second hour of Unang Hirit (around 6:00 to 7:00am) block. Few days after the finale, it was revealed that the program was cancelled by the network due to the strategic streamlining undertaken to all of its regional stations.

GMA Dagupan would not have a regional morning newscast until five years later, with the launch of Mornings with GMA Regional TV. was Hosted by Multi Awarded Anchor of Balitang Amianan (now One North Central Luzon) CJ Torida and Presenter Harold Reyes.

Final hosts
Alfie Tulagan
Jette Arcellana

Former hosts
CJ Torida
Joyce Segui
May Velasco
Peha Lagao
Ivy Andrada
Mike Sabado
Mina Gutierrez
Joanne Ponsoy

References 

GMA Network news shows
GMA Integrated News and Public Affairs shows
Philippine television news shows
2009 Philippine television series debuts
2015 Philippine television series endings